Bivin is a surname. Notable people with the surname include:

David Bivin (born 1939), Israeli-American biblical scholar and author
Jim Bivin (1909–1982), American baseball player and manager

See also
 Bivins